Virginia Cherrill (April 12, 1908 – November 14, 1996) was an American actress best known for her role as the blind flower girl in Charlie Chaplin's City Lights (1931).

Early life
Virginia Cherrill was born on a farm in rural Carthage, Illinois to James E. and Blanche (née Wilcox) Cherrill. She attended schools in Chicago and Kenosha, Wisconsin.

She initially did not plan on a film career, but her friendship with Sue Carol (who later married Alan Ladd) eventually drew her to Hollywood. She had been voted "Queen of the Artists Ball" in Chicago in 1925 and was invited to perform on the variety stage by Florenz Ziegfeld, an offer she declined. She found her first marriage unsatisfying, and through her friendship with Sue Carol, decamped to California where she met William Randolph Hearst, went to Hollywood for a visit and met Charlie Chaplin when he sat next to her at a boxing match; however, Chaplin wrote in his autobiography that she approached him on the beach wanting him to cast her in his film while acknowledging that he had met her before.

Career
[[File:Chaplin City Lights still.jpg|right|thumb|Chaplin and Cherrill in City Lights]]
Chaplin soon cast Cherrill in City Lights. Although the film and her performance were well-received, her working relationship with Chaplin on the film was often strained. As indicated in the documentary Unknown Chaplin, Cherrill was fired from the film for leaving the set for a hairdressing appointment at one point and Chaplin planned to re-film all her scenes with Georgia Hale, but ultimately realized too much money had already been spent on the film. Cherrill recalls in the documentary that she followed close friend Marion Davies's advice to hold out for more money when Chaplin asked her to return to the film.

Even before City Lights was released, 20th Century Fox signed Cherrill to a contract. Following the success of City Lights, the studio put her to work in early sound films of the 1930s, such as Girls Demand Excitement (1931), one of John Wayne's early films as a star. Big-name directors cast her in their films, such as John Ford in The Brat (1931) and Tod Browning in Fast Workers (1933). She also appeared in the 1931 Gershwin musical Delicious with Janet Gaynor. She then went to Britain where she starred in two of James Mason's earlier films, including Troubled Waters, which turned out to be her last film. None of these later films were hits, and she gave up her film career, claiming that she was "no great shakes as an actress."

Personal life
Cherrill married four times.  She had no children.

Her first husband, Irving Adler, was a rich Chicago lawyer (not the famed scientist Irving Adler). They were married in 1925 and divorced in 1928.

Considerable publicity attended an engagement to the wealthy William Rhinelander Stewart Jr. (1888-1945) that was announced in July 1932. The two sailed from Hawaii on Vincent Astor's yacht, on which the ceremony was planned, but returned thereafter, having broken off the wedding by mutual consent.

Cherrill married actor Cary Grant on February 9, 1934, in London. She received a divorce on March 26, 1935, in Los Angeles after alleging that Grant was abusive toward her.

Her third husband was George Child-Villiers, 9th Earl of Jersey, from 1937 to 1946. She changed her legal name to Virginia Child-Villiers, countess of Jersey.

Cherrill finally settled down with Florian Martini, a Polish airman whose squadron she had looked after during World War II. He found a job working for Lockheed Martin in Santa Barbara, California, where they lived from 1948 until her death in 1996 at age 88.

 Recognition 
Cherrill has a star on the Hollywood Walk of Fame at 1545 Vine Street.

 Filmography 

References
Notes

Bibliography

 Eagan, Daniel. America's Film Legacy: The Authoritative Guide To The Landmark Movies In The National Film Registry. London: Continuum Publishing Group, 2010. .
 Seymour, Miranda. Chaplin's Girl: The Life and Loves of Virginia Cherrill''. New York: Simon & Schuster, 2009. .

External links 

 
 
 Virginia Cherrill at Virtual History

20th-century American actresses
American film actresses
Jersey
Actresses from Illinois
Actresses from Santa Barbara, California
People from Carthage, Illinois
1908 births
1996 deaths
Burials at Santa Barbara Cemetery
20th-century English nobility